Pot Luck is a 1936 British comedy film directed by and starring Tom Walls. The screenplay is by Ben Travers based loosely on his 1930 stage play A Night Like This. It also featured Ralph Lynn, Robertson Hare, Diana Churchill and Martita Hunt. The cast included members of the regular Aldwych Farce company.

Plot
A retired Scotland Yard detective, Patrick Fitzpatrick (Tom Walls) comes back to take one final case, tracking down a missing vase which has been stolen by a gang of thieves specialising in taking art treasures. His investigation takes him to the home of the innocent Mr Pye (Robertson Hare), whose house has been used by the crooks to hide their proceeds.

Cast
 Tom Walls as Inspector Patrick Fitzpatrick
 Ralph Lynn as Reggie Bathbrick
 Diana Churchill as Jane Bathbrick
 Robertson Hare as Mr Pye
 Peter Gawthorne as Chief Constable
 Gordon James as Cream (the butler)
 Martita Hunt as Mrs Cream (the cook)
 J.A. O'Rourke as Kelly
 Cyril Smith as Miller

Critical reception
Writing for The Spectator in 1936, Graham Greene gave the film a neutral review, praising the direction and the acting of Tom Walls and of Robertson Hare, but deigning to praise Ralph Lynn for his performance explaining that he had a peculiar antipathy toward his acting.

References

External links

1936 films
1936 comedy films
British comedy films
Films scored by Jack Beaver
British black-and-white films
1930s English-language films
1930s British films